Daouda Diakité (born 20 March 1977) is a Malian footballer. He played in 39 matches for the Mali national football team from 1995 to 2005. He was also named in Mali's squad for the 2002 African Cup of Nations tournament.

References

External links
 

1977 births
Living people
Malian footballers
Mali international footballers
2002 African Cup of Nations players
Place of birth missing (living people)
Association football defenders
AS Real Bamako players
Djoliba AC players
CO de Bamako players
Stade Briochin players
Malian expatriate footballers
Malian expatriate sportspeople in France
Expatriate footballers in France
21st-century Malian people